The 2012 Trans-Tasman Champions League was the inaugural tournament between the Australian Ice Hockey League and the New Zealand Ice Hockey League played on July 7 and 8, 2012. It was held at the Medibank Icehouse in Melbourne. Each league fielded their best two teams from the 2011 season, and in a single field game round robin, played against the teams of the other league. The Southern Stampede finished fourth after losing both games and finishing with a minus 18 goal differential, Botany Swarm finished third after losing both games but finishing with a goal differential of minus six, and the Newcastle Northstars finished second after winning both games and finishing with a plus 11 goal differential. The Melbourne Ice finished in first place with a 2–0 record and a +13 goal differential.

Background
The Trans-Tasman Champions League was first announced in August 2011 by the Australian Ice Hockey League and the New Zealand Ice Hockey League. The 2012 Trans-Tasman Champions League was held on 7 and 8 July at the Medibank Icehouse in Melbourne, Victoria, Australia. The tournament consisted of four teams, two from each of the represented leagues. The Australian Ice Hockey League was represented by the Melbourne Ice, the 2011 regular season and Goodall Cup winner, and the Newcastle North Stars, the runner-up of the 2011 Goodall Cup. The New Zealand Ice Hockey League was represented by the Botany Swarm, the 2011 regular season and Birgel Cup winner, and the Southern Stampede, the runner-up of the 2011 Birgel Cup. Teams played two games during the tournament with both games being played against the opposing league teams. Prior to the start of the tournament it was announced that the City of Melbourne had signed as the official sponsors for the tournament. The Melbourne Ice won the tournament after winning both of their games and finishing with the best goal difference in the tournament. Newcastle finished second after winning both of their games against the New Zealand teams but fell short of first place based on goal difference. Both New Zealand teams failed to win either of their games however the Botany Swarm finished ahead of the Southern Stampede with a better goal difference.

Standings

Fixtures
All times local.

Scoring leaders
List shows the top ten skaters sorted by points, then goals, assists, and the lower penalties in minutes.

Goaltenders
Goaltenders are sorted based on save percentage.

References

Trans-Tasman Champions League
2012
Trans-Tasman Champions League
2012 in Australian sport